Xylomyidae is a family of flies known commonly as the wood soldier flies. They are xylophagous and are associated with dead or dying wood.

Description

For terms see Morphology of Diptera.

These flies are 4 to 14 millimeters long. Their coloration is variable. They have spurs on the mid and hind tibiae. The antennae are conical.

Genera
As of 2011 there were 138 described species in four genera. These include:
Arthropeina Lindner, 1949
A. fulva Lindner, 1949
Coenomyiodes Brunetti, 1920
C. edwardsi Brunetti, 1920
Solva Walker, 1859
S. dorsiflava Yang & Nagatomi, 1993
S. freyi Nagatomi, 1975
S. inamoena Walker, 1859
S. marginata (Meigen, 1820)
S. micholitzi (Enderlein, 1921)
S. nigritibialis (Macquart, 1839)
S. pallipes (Loew, 1863)
S. schnitnikovi Krivosheina, 1972
S. varia (Meigen, 1820)
S. vittipes Bezzi, 1914
Xylomya Rondani, 1861
X. fasciatus (Say, 1829)
X. luteicornis (Frey, 1960)
X. maculata (Meigen, 1804)
X. simillima Steyskal, 1947
X. trinotata (Bigot, 1880)

Extinct genera 

 †Archosolva Grimaldi 2016 Burmese amber, Myanmar, Cenomanian
 †Cretarthropeina Solórzano Kraemer and Cumming 2019 Burmese amber, Myanmar, Cenomanian
 †Cretasolva Grimaldi 2016 Burmese amber, Myanmar, Cenomanian
 †Cretoxyla Grimaldi and Cumming 2011 Lebanese amber, Barremian
 †Pankowskia Solórzano Kraemer and Cumming 2019 Burmese amber, Myanmar, Cenomanian

Species lists
Palaearctic
Nearctic
Australasian/Oceanian
Japan
Great Britain

Phylogeny

References

External links

Xylomyidae in Italian
Image Gallery from Diptera.info
Family description
Xylomyia maculata Species page from Polish Red Data Book

 
Brachycera families
Taxa named by Johannes C. H. de Meijere